Capitol Music Group (CMG) is an American front line umbrella label distributed by Universal Music Group which oversees handling of record labels assigned to UMG's Capitol Records division. It was inherited from UMG's acquisition of EMI's catalog (with the exception of Parlophone, which was sold to Warner Music Group in 2013). It is one of seven umbrella labels distributed by UMG, the other six being Interscope Geffen A&M, Island Records, Def Jam Recordings, Republic Records, Verve Records, and Decca Records. The current chair and CEO is Michelle Jubelirer.

History

Capitol Music Group was formed in February 2007 as a merger of Capitol Records and Virgin Records America in an effort by EMI to restructure and save an average of $217 million yearly. Both Virgin Records and Capitol Records, however, remained imprints of the label.

Virgin Records CEO Jason Flom was named the head of the division, with Capitol Records CEO Andy Slater resigning after receiving a pension reportedly worth more than $15 million. As the head of the label, Flom reported directly to EMI Group CEO Eric Nicoli.

A total of 283 artists signed to Capitol Music Group, including Mims, LeToya Luckett, J. Holiday, Royal Bliss, Mack 10, Faith Evans, Fat Joe, and since 2007, Katy Perry, Barbara Pravi, Paul McCartney, Duncan Laurence, Calum Scott, Ferras, and Rucka Rucka Ali. In 2014 both Morrissey and Neil Diamond were confirmed to have signed with Capitol Records, Morrissey having signed a two-album deal. However, the latter was given to Parlophone as a result of that label's sale to Warner Music.

In 2010, Virgin Records was spun off from Capitol Music Group to form Virgin Music Group; as of 2013, however, the Virgin Music Group was dissolved, resulting in Virgin Records returning to its placement under CMG.

In November 2012, it was announced that Steve Barnett would become the chairman and CEO of the company.

With EMI's absorption (sans Parlophone) into Universal Music Group complete, Capitol Music Group is now part of UMG's five label units in the UK. The Beatles have been confirmed to appear on Capitol UK.

In April 2013, Robbie McIntosh was named head of Capitol's international operations.

In November 2016, the company's chairman and CEO Steve Barnett announced that the company has three endeavors planned out that include music, film and literary projects that pay tribute to eight decades' worth of artists signed to the label.

In November 2020, Jeff Vaughn was named new Chairman/CEO, replacing Steve Barnett.

In December 2021, Michelle Jubelirer was promoted to chair and CEO of Capitol Music Group. She reports to Universal Music Group chairman and CEO Lucian Grainge.

Sub-labels 
 Capitol Records
 Motown Records
 Blue Note Records
 EMI
 Astralwerks
 Harvest Records 
 Capitol Christian Music Group
 Metamorphosis Music

Labels managed
Through flagship label Capitol, CMG handles the back catalogs and has assumed the copyrights of master recordings from the following labels and sub-labels acquired or distributed by UMG's predecessor EMI throughout its existence:
 3C Records
 Aladdin Records
 Amada Records
 Angel Records (US)
 Apple Records
 Ascot Records
 Blue Thumb Records (1970–71 titles distributed by Capitol)
 Chrysalis Records (US & Canada and rest of the world outside the UK)
 DCP International
 Dolton Records
 EMI America Records
 EMI Records (US until 1997; Canada)
 Enigma Records
 Freedom Records (1950s)
 Harvest Records (North America, until 2012)
 Imperial Records (until 1970)
 I.R.S. Records
 Laurie Records
 Liberty Records (North America, until 1970; 1980s)
 Manhattan Records (1980s)
 Mediarts Records
 Minit Records
 Nocturne Records
 Pacific Jazz Records
 SBK Records
 Shelter Records (distributed by Capitol between 1970–73)
 Solid State Records (1960s)
 Sue Records
 Unart Records
 United Artists Records (North America)
 Veep Records
 Virgin Records America

See also
 List of record labels
 Universal Music Group

References

External links
 

Record labels established in 2007
American record labels
Labels distributed by Universal Music Group
Rock record labels
Pop record labels
Capitol Records
Virgin Records
EMI
Companies based in Los Angeles
2007 establishments in California
Record labels based in California